Jansiac is a French intentional community founded in 1974.

References 

Intentional communities